This is a list of supermarket chains in Finland.

References 

Supermarkets
Supermarkets
Finland